The Investment Exchanges and Clearing Houses Act 2006 (c 55) is an Act of the Parliament of the United Kingdom. It was intended to meet concerns that recognised investment exchanges and clearing houses might introduce excessive regulation. This Act is amended by articles 3 and 6 the Treaty of Lisbon (Changes in Terminology) Order 2011 (S.I. 2011/1043).

Section 1 - Power of FSA to disallow excessive regulatory provision
This section inserts section 300A of the Financial Services and Markets Act 2000.

Section 2 - Procedural and other supplementary provisions
This section inserts sections 300B to 300E of the Financial Services and Markets Act 2000.

Section 3 - Interim power to give directions about notification
This section ceased to have effect on 19 December 2007.

Section 4 - Consequential amendment of grounds for refusing recognition
This section inserts section 290A of the Financial Services and Markets Act 2000.

References
Halsbury's Statutes,

External links
The Investment Exchanges and Clearing Houses Act 2006, as amended from the National Archives.
The Investment Exchanges and Clearing Houses Act 2006, as originally enacted from the National Archives.
Explanatory notes to the Investment Exchanges and Clearing Houses Act 2006.

United Kingdom Acts of Parliament 2006